Pleasure or Pain is a 2013 erotic thriller film written and directed by Zalman King. The film was shot between Malibu, Santa Monica and Westlake in California in the United States.

Plot
Victoria is a beautiful young woman who is just beginning to get a bit of success as a jewelry designer in Los Angeles. One day she meets the handsome and wealthy entrepreneur Jack. He manages to seduce her with an irresistible combination of charm and sensuality. With him, everything is better and more intense than she has ever experienced: love, sex, ecstasy. She wants to do everything to make her lover happy. He keeps on going with his erotic games and he immerses her in a world of sexuality that she didn’t even know existed. But after a while, the adventure becomes too much.

Cast
 Malena Morgan: Victoria
 Christos Vasilopoulos: Jack (as Christos G. Vass)
 Kayla Jane: Isabel
 Elle Alexandra: Rita (as Elle Alexandria)
 Daniel Sobieray: Antonio
 Hayden Hawkens: Eve
 Aubrey Addams: Adelaide
 Stephanie Danielson: Trish
 Ela Darling: Attendant

References

External links
 

2013 films
2010s erotic thriller films
American erotic thriller films
2010s English-language films
Films directed by Zalman King
2010s American films